Bead and reel is an architectural motif, usually found in sculptures, moldings and numismatics. It consists in a thin line where beadlike elements alternate with cylindrical ones. It is found throughout the modern Western world in architectural detail, particularly on Greek/Roman style buildings, wallpaper borders, and interior moulding design. It is often used in combination with the egg-and-dart motif.

According to art historian John Boardman, the bead and reels motif was entirely developed in Greece from motifs derived from the turning techniques used for wood and metal, and was first employed in stone sculpture in Greece during the 6th century BC. The motif then spread to Persia, Egypt and the Hellenistic world, and as far as India, where it can be found on the abacus part of some of the Pillars of Ashoka or the Pataliputra capital.  Bead and reel motifs can be found abundantly in Greek and Hellenistic sculpture and on the border of Hellenistic coins.

See also 
 Pearl circle

References

Ornaments (architecture)
Visual motifs